468 AD/CE is a year of the Julian calendar.

468 may also refer to:
 468 (number)
 468 BC, /BCE; a year (ISO year -467; Holocene calendar year 9533; 2417 BP)

Places
 468 Lina, a main-belt asteroid, the 468th asteroid registered
 Area code 468, a telephone area code for Quebec, Canada
 Route 468, see List of highways numbered 468
 Rural Municipality of Meota No. 468 (RM 468), Saskatchewan, Canada
 Chung Fu stop, Hong Kong, station code

Military

Military units numbered 468 
 468th (2/1st North Midland) Field Company, Royal Engineers, UK
 468th Bombardment Group, a WWII U.S. Army Air Force unit
 468th Strategic Fighter Squadron, a U.S. Air Force unit
 468th Marine Brigade (South Vietnam)

Naval ships with pennant number 468 

 , a U.S. Navy WWII Fletcher-class destroyer
 , a UK Royal Navy WWII Captain-class frigate
 , a U.S. Navy WWII landing ship
 , a Nazi Germany WWII Type VIIC submarine

Other uses
 Braille pattern dots-468
 468 (New Jersey bus), a public bus route in New Jersey, United States
 London Buses route 468, a public bus route in London, England, UK

See also

 United Nations Security Council Resolution 468 (1980)
 
 46800 (disambiguation)
 4680 (disambiguation)